Surrey-White Rock is a provincial electoral district for the Legislative Assembly of British Columbia, Canada.  During the 2008 re-distribution of riding boundaries, Surrey-White Rock kept the majority of its existing region.

Demographics

Geography 
The riding is bounded on the south and west by Semiahmoo Bay, on the east by Highway 99, and on the north by 24th Avenue. The riding contains the southwest corner of Surrey, the city of White Rock, and the Semiahmoo Indian Reserve.

History 
This riding has elected the following Members of Legislative Assembly:

Member of Legislative Assembly 
The current MLA is Trevor Halford. He was elected in 2020. The previous MLA was Tracy Redies, first elected in 2017, she was the former CEO of Coast Capital Savings and now the CEO for Science World. And before Redies was Gordon Hogg, a former mayor of White Rock first elected in a 1997 by-election. Hogg, Redies and Halford all represent the British Columbia Liberal Party.

Election results 

|-

|-

|-

|-

|-

|- bgcolor="white"
!align="right" colspan=3|Total Valid Votes
!align="right"|25,982
!align="right"|99.7%
!align="right"|
|- bgcolor="white"
!align="right" colspan=3|Total Rejected Ballots
!align="right"|74
!align="right"|0.3%
!align="right"|
|- bgcolor="white"
!align="right" colspan=3|Turnout
!align="right"|26,056
!align="right"|64.73%
!align="right"|
|}

|-

|-

 
|NDP
|Matt Todd
|align="right"|3,415
|align="right"|12.56%
|align="right"|-13.87%
|align="right"|$5,509

|}

|-

|}

|-

|-
 
|NDP
|David Thompson
|align="right"|8,215
|align="right"|26.43%
|align="right"|-5.55%
|align="right"|$46,434

|Independent
|Kathy Burden
|align="right"|295
|align="right"|0.95%
|align="right"|-
|align="right"|

|}

|-

 
|NDP
|Donna Osatiuk
|align="right"|9,063
|align="right"|31.98%
|align="right"|
|align="right"|$28,721
|-

|}

References

External links 
BC Stats
Results of 2001 election (pdf)
2001 Expenditures (pdf)
Results of 1996 election
1996 Expenditures
Results of 1991 election
1991 Expenditures
Website of the Legislative Assembly of British Columbia

British Columbia provincial electoral districts
Politics of Surrey, British Columbia
White Rock, British Columbia
Provincial electoral districts in Greater Vancouver and the Fraser Valley